All U Need Is Mosh is an album released by Plastilina Mosh on August 5, 2008.

Track listing 
 "Toll Free" – 3:21
 "Jonaz Goes to Hollywood" – 4:04
 "My Party" – 3:01
 "Let U Know" – 3:38
 "Cut the Crap" – 2:48
 "Arriba Dicembre" – 4:10
 "Danny Trejo" – 4:00
 "Going to Mars Bolton" – 4:59
 "Comeback Bitch" – 4:08
 "San Diego Chargers" – 4:13
 "Paso Fino" – 6:09
 "Pervert Pop Song" – 4:04

Release and reception 
The reviews of the album were generally positive, including a four star rating by Tijana Ilich from About.com, who liked the fusion of different styles including rap, pop, punk, dance and metal.

The song "Let U Know" is featured in EA Sports game, FIFA 09 as part of the soundtrack.

The San Diego Reader wrote that "San Diego Chargers"  would not supplant "San Diego Super Chargers" as the top song among fans of the National Football League's San Diego Chargers team. The Tucson Weekly praised the song's "spine-tingling, halftime march". Metromix called it "[o]ne of the most charming songs on the album ... a marching, drum-heavy groove." Composer Alejandro Rosso said he was not a Chargers fan but "think[s] that they have a cool team"; he did not want to name the song after the Dallas Cowboys.

Personnel 
 Alejandro Rosso – guitar, bass, vocals, keyboard
 Jonás González – guitar, bass, vocals
 Eddie González – guitar, bass, keyboard, backing vocals
 Natalia Slipak – drums, backing vocals
 Milton Pacheco – bass, guitar, backing vocals
 Pedro Martínez — drum loop with flanger on “Danny Trejo”

References 

2008 albums
Plastilina Mosh albums